Qiui is a Chinese company that manufactures Internet-connected sex toys.

The company's most famous product is the Cellmate remote-controlled chastity cage, which is Bluetooth-controlled and communicates with the Internet via a cellphone app. When locked, the cage is held closed by a locking pin. In normal operation, the locking pin can only be released by a small electric motor that is controlled by an onboard micro-controller. In October 2020, a group of security researchers revealed that the Cellmate's API was exploitable in a way such that Cellmate devices could be permanently locked shut, trapping the user's penis in the device. Qiui provided a software work-around using an updated version of the app, and a physical solution, if all else fails, of using a screwdriver to disassemble the device.

References

External links

Companies based in Foshan
Sex toy manufacturers
Sexual abstinence
Teledildonics